Lawrence D'Orsay (1853 – 1931); some sources (Lawrance D'Orsay), was a British born stage and film actor.

Biography
He was born in 1853 as Dorset William Lawrance to solicitor John W. Lawrance. He was educated at Merchant Taylors' School and was intended to go into Law. Made his first appearance on the stage in 1877, he toured the English provinces for five years to 1882. Much work in London theatres. He went to New York City in 1884, making his first appearance at Haverley's Theatre on 6 October 1884. He started in silent films in 1912, making his last film in 1926.

Selected filmography
Ruggles of Red Gap (1918)
The Bond Boy (1923)
His Children's Children (1923)
The Side Show of Life (1924)
Miss Bluebeard (1925)
The Sorrows of Satan (1926)

References

External links

portrait Gallery (University of Washington, Sayre collection)

1853 births
1931 deaths
Actors from Northamptonshire